|}

The Glorious Stakes is a Group 3 flat horse race in Great Britain open to horses aged four years or older. It is run at Goodwood over a distance of 1 mile 3 furlongs and 218 yards (2,412 metres), and it is scheduled to take place each year in late July or early August.

History
The event was established in 1979, and it was initially called the Alycidon Stakes. It was named after Alycidon, a successful racehorse whose victories included the Goodwood Cup in 1949. It was originally a conditions race for horses aged three or older, and it was given Listed status in 1985.

The title of the race was changed to the Alycidon Glorious Stakes in 1987, and it became known as the Glorious Stakes in 1989. The minimum age of participating horses was raised to four in 1993, and from this point it was run as a limited handicap. It reverted to being a conditions race in 2004, and it was promoted to Group 3 level in 2008. The race has been sponsored by L'Omarins since 2019 and named the L'Ormarins Queen's Plate to link the race with the South African race of that name

The Glorious Stakes is currently held on the fourth day of the five-day Glorious Goodwood meeting.

Records

Most successful horse (2 wins):
 Capstan – 1981, 1982

Leading jockey (4 wins):
 Willie Carson – Water Mill (1980), Capstan (1981, 1982), Seymour Hicks (1983)

Leading trainer (7 wins):
 Luca Cumani – Knockando (1987), Hajade (1990), Midnight Legend (1995), Alkaased (2004), Purple Moon (2007), Drunken Sailor (2011), Quest for Peace (2012)

Winners

See also
 Horse racing in Great Britain
 List of British flat horse races
 Recurring sporting events established in 1979  – this race is included under its original title, Alycidon Stakes.

References
 Paris-Turf: 
 Racing Post:
 galopp-sieger.de – Glorious Stakes.
 ifhaonline.org – International Federation of Horseracing Authorities – Glorious Stakes (2019).
 pedigreequery.com – Glorious Stakes – Goodwood.

Flat races in Great Britain
Goodwood Racecourse
Open middle distance horse races
1979 establishments in England